WRLL (1450 AM) is a Spanish variety radio station licensed to Cicero, Illinois, and serving the Chicago market. The station is owned by Midway Broadcasting.

History

In 2006, WVON, which had long operated on 1450 AM, moved to 1690 AM. The WRLL callsign, which had been held by the original station on 1690 AM, "Real Oldies 1690", was shifted to 1450, and the station adopted a Spanish-language format called "Radio Latino". In 2009 WRLL moved to a more Mexican-oriented format and named itself after the popular Mexican brand "Radio Fórmula". As of 2015 the station dropped the "Radio Formula" name and refers to itself in Spanish as 1450 AM.

Until 2021, WRLL shared the 1450 kHz frequency with brokered ethnic station WCEV. After WCEV shut down and had its license cancelled, WRLL gained full control over the frequency, allowing it to become a 24-hour station on October 18, 2021.

References

External links

Mexican-American culture in Illinois
RLL